The tadpole-gobies (Benthophilus), also called pugolovkas (which means "tadpole" in Ukrainian), are a genus of Ponto-Caspian fishes in the family Gobiidae.

They are distributed in the fresh and brackish waters of basins of the Black Sea,  Caspian Sea and the Sea of Azov, up to salinities of about 20 ‰.  They typically live in habitats such as the deep waters of the Caspian (salinity about 13 ‰) and in the deltas, estuaries and coastal waters of the Ponto-Caspian.

Tadpole-gobies are small fish, never larger than 15 cm, and usually smaller. Their life span is about one year. After spawning they die.

Species
There are currently 20 recognized species in this genus:
 Benthophilus abdurahmanovi Ragimov, 1978 (Abdurahmanov's pugolovka)
 Benthophilus baeri Kessler, 1877 (Baer pugolovka)
 Benthophilus casachicus Ragimov, 1978
 Benthophilus ctenolepidus Kessler, 1877
 Benthophilus durrelli Boldyrev & Bogutskaya, 2004 (Don tadpole-goby)
 Benthophilus granulosus Kessler, 1877 (Granular pugolovka)
 Benthophilus grimmi Kessler, 1877
 Benthophilus kessleri L. S. Berg, 1927
 Benthophilus leobergius L. S. Berg, 1949 (Caspian stellate tadpole-goby)
 Benthophilus leptocephalus Kessler, 1877
 Benthophilus leptorhynchus Kessler, 1877 (Short-snout pugolovka)
 Benthophilus macrocephalus (Pallas, 1787) (Caspian tadpole goby)
 Benthophilus magistri Iljin, 1927 (Azov tadpole goby)
 Benthophilus mahmudbejovi Ragimov, 1976 (Small-spine tadpole-goby)
 Benthophilus nudus L. S. Berg, 1898 (Black Sea tadpole-goby)
 Benthophilus pinchuki Ragimov, 1982
 Benthophilus ragimovi	Boldyrev & Bogutskaya, 2004 	 
 Benthophilus spinosus Kessler, 1877 (Spiny pugolovka)
 Benthophilus stellatus (Sauvage, 1874) (Stellate tadpole-goby)
 Benthophilus svetovidovi Pinchuk & Ragimov, 1979

References

Benthophilinae